Leila Hoffman (née Rothstein) (born 11 June 1934 in Hackney) is an English comedian, actress and writer.

Personal life

Hoffman is the daughter of Esther (née Schaewitch) (1906–1992) and Joseph "Joe" Rothstein, both children of Russian Jews. She has one sister, Sybil Fox, who is four years her senior.
In 1960, Leila married Alfred Hoffman in Brighton, where the Rothstein family had relocated to sometime after Leila's birth.

Recent work

Hoffman starred in BBC Three sitcom, How Not to Live Your Life as Dot Treacher, the widowed neighbour. She has also appeared in several online BBC comedy sketches with the group This is Wondervision.

Film
Magician's Assistant, Magicians (2007), Intermedia/Universal, Andrew O'Connor.
Augusta Longbottom, Harry Potter and the Philosopher's Stone (2001), Warner Brothers, Chris Columbus.
Bag Lady, Felicia's Journey (1999), Marquis Films, Atom Egoyan.
Principal Witch, The Witches (1990), Jim Henson Films, Nic Roeg.

Television
Mrs Rossiter, Doctor Who, DW Productions, Richard Clark
Old Lady, Not Going Out, Avalon for BBC TV, Nick Wood
Mrs Treacher, How Not to Live Your Life, Brown Eyed Boy for BBC Three, Sam Leifer
Mrs Lambert, EastEnders, 25th anniversary DVD, BBC TV, Jenny Darnell
Mrs Treacher, How Not to Live Your Life, Brown Eyed Boy for BBC Three, Martin Dennis
Granny Smith, Skins, Company Pictures for E4, Simon Massey
Mrs Treacher, How Not to Live Your Life, Brown Eyed Boy for BBC Three, Gary Reich
Mad Alice, Magnolia, Red Productions For BBC TV, Jim Doyle
Mrs Treacher, How Not to Live Your Life, Brown Eyed Boy, Gary Reich
Mother, Party Pieces (sketch show), Objective Productions for E4, Paul King
Barry's Mum, Respectable, Silver River Productions, Dominic Brigstocke
Various Roles, Old Gits, World of Wonder For BBC TV, Gary Reich
Old Lady in Various Sketches, There's a German on my Sunbed (6 Eps), Granada TV, Pete Rowe
Aunt Vera, According to Bex, BBC TV, Dewi Humphreys
Mrs Mollinson, Bad Education, BBC Three
Mrs Webster, Beneath the Skin, Granada TV, Sarah Harding
Gladys Randall, Doctors and Nurses, BBC TV, Caroline Jeffries
Old Woman-sketches, 15 Storeys High, BBC TV, Mark Nunneley
Margaret, Grass, BBC TV, Martin Dennis
Ricky Grover's Mad Aunt Rose, BULLA, BBC Pilot, Andrew Gillman
Silly Old Lady, MICHAEL BARRYMORE SHOW, LWT, Russel Norman
Mrs Impey, ONE FOOT IN THE GRAVE, BBC TV, Christine Gernon
Ricky's Mum, RICKY GERVAIS SHOW, LWT, Various
Old Lady, THE HIDDEN CAMERA, Pola Jones Films, Carol Chamberlain
Old Lady, RED HANDED, LWT, David Tibbles
Mrs Thingy, ROGER ROGER, BBC TV, Tony Dow
Various Characters, Hearts of Gold – (5 Series Regular), BBC TV, Various
Miss Jemima Pinkerton, VANITY FAIR, BBC TV, Diarmuid Lawrence

References

External links
 
 

English women comedians
English film actresses
English comedy writers
English television actresses
Living people
1934 births
English people of Russian descent
Jewish English actresses
People from Hackney Central